Glenn Taylor Helzer (born July 26, 1970) is a self-declared prophet, former cult leader and spree killer who founded and led the Children of Thunder. Helzer and his followers murdered five people as part of an extortion plot intended to culminate with Helzer taking over the Church of Jesus Christ of Latter-day Saints (LDS Church) and hastening the return of Christ; among their victims was Selina Bishop, daughter of blues guitarist Elvin Bishop.

Early life
Glenn Taylor Helzer was born in Lansing, Michigan, on July 26, 1970, to Gerry and Carma Helzer, both devout Mormons.  He had a younger sister, Heather, and brother Justin. Helzer graduated from Ygnacio Valley High School and served in the National Guard in Texas and as a missionary in Brazil. He worked as a stock broker for Morgan Stanley Dean Witter until August 1998, when he went on disability after being diagnosed with bipolar disorder.

Helzer married his wife, Ann, in April 1993. They had two daughters before separating in June 1996.

Children of Thunder
Glenn Helzer and his brother Justin met Dawn Godman on Memorial Day 1999 at a murder mystery dinner hosted by a Mormon congregation in Walnut Creek, California. Godman became Justin's girlfriend and moved into a house in Concord with the Helzer brothers in April 2000.

Glenn Helzer was excommunicated from the LDS Church in 1998 due to his drug use. Around this time; he declared himself a prophet. He developed a list of maxims he called “The Twelve Principles of Magic,” by which he expected his followers to abide.  He had plans to train Brazilian orphans to assassinate Mormon leaders so that he could take over the LDS Church and start a self-help group called Transform America, which was intended to “create a state of peace and joy.” Helzer collectively referred to himself and his followers as the Children of Thunder.

Murders
To finance his plans, Helzer developed a scheme to extort money from Ivan and Annette Stineman, an elderly couple in Concord, California, who had been Helzer's clients when he was employed as a stockbroker. On July 30, 2000, the Helzer brothers and Godman kidnapped the Stinemans and forced them to write checks for $100,000 before murdering them.

The trio then murdered Glenn Helzer's girlfriend, Selina Bishop, on August 2 in order to prevent her from potentially providing information that could lead to his arrest. To extort the Stinemans' money, Helzer convinced Bishop (who knew him as Jordan), to open bank accounts in her name for Helzer's use; he told her that he was inheriting a large sum of money, which he needed to hide from his ex-wife.

Helzer and Godman then went to Bishop's apartment, where Bishop's mother, Jennifer Villarin, was staying; Helzer had decided to eliminate Villarin because she had seen him, and he feared she could identify him. He murdered Villarin and her friend, James Gamble (who was at the apartment that night), using a gun registered to Justin Helzer.

Arrest and trial
The five murders were connected when police recovered duffel bags from the Sacramento River Delta, which contained the dismembered remains of Bishop and the Stinemans. Investigators searched the Stineman residence and found a note by Ivan Stineman mentioning Taylor Helzer. Friends of Bishop were shown a photo of Helzer, whom they identified as Jordan. A Department of Motor Vehicles check revealed that he owned a 1998 Saturn sedan and Justin owned a white 1995 Nissan pickup, which matched descriptions of vehicles believed to be connected to the murders. Investigators also found that Justin had recently purchased a 9-millimeter Beretta, the same gun used to kill Villarin and Gamble. Fingerprints belonging to Justin and Godman were found in the Stinemans' van, which had been stolen and abandoned.

On August 7, 2000, police arrested Justin Helzer and Godman at their Concord home. Glenn fled to a nearby house, where he threatened a woman and demanded money, a gun, and a car. He cut off his ponytail and then left through the back door; he was arrested shortly after that.

Godman accepted a plea deal and agreed to testify against Helzer's; she was sentenced to twenty-five years to life in prison for the murders and twelve years and eight months for other charges related to the murders. Glenn pleaded guilty to all charges and was sentenced to death. Justin pleaded not guilty by reason of insanity, with his attorneys claiming that he had a delusional disorder. Justin was found guilty and sentenced to death.
Justin attempted suicide in 2010 by ramming pens into both his eyeballs. He survived but was left blinded and with brain damage. Justin committed suicide by hanging on April 14, 2013, while incarcerated at San Quentin.

See also
 List of death row inmates in the United States

References

Bibliography
 

1970 births
2000 murders in the United States
Latter Day Saints from California
American stockbrokers
Criminals of the San Francisco Bay Area
Texas National Guard personnel
People convicted of murder by California
Prisoners sentenced to death by California
Religious leaders from the San Francisco Bay Area
21st-century American criminals
Murder in the San Francisco Bay Area
People excommunicated by the Church of Jesus Christ of Latter-day Saints
People with bipolar disorder
Self-declared messiahs
Living people
American Mormon missionaries in Brazil
American spree killers
Cult leaders